Hurstpierpoint and Sayers Common is a civil parish in Mid Sussex District, West Sussex, England.

Settlements

Major settlements
Hurstpierpoint
Sayers Common

Other settlements
Bedlam Street
Goddards Green
Hurst Wickham

Other places 

 Danny Park

References

Civil parishes in West Sussex